The Town of Mead is a Statutory Town in Weld County, Colorado, United States.  The town population was 3,405 at the 2010 United States Census.

History
A post office called Mead has been in operation since 1907. The town was named after Dr. Martin S. Mead, a pioneer settler.

Geography

Mead is located at  (40.224781, -104.988573). It sits approximately 35 miles north of the State Capitol in Denver.

Demographics

As of the census of 2010, there were 3,405 people, 1,215 housing units (1,164 occupied), and 573 families residing in the town. The racial makeup of the town was 95.69% White, 0.15% African American, 0.59% Native American, 0.50% Asian, 1.83% from other races, and 1.24% from two or more races. Hispanic or Latino of any race were 6.94% of the population.

There were 641 households, out of which 52.4% had children under the age of 18 living with them, 82.2% were married couples living together, 5.0% had a female householder with no husband present, and 10.5% were non-families. 7.5% of all households were made up of individuals, and 2.2% had someone living alone who was 65 years of age or older. The average household size was 3.15 and the average family size was 3.31.

In the town, the population was spread out, with 34.8% under the age of 18, 4.9% from 18 to 24, 35.7% from 25 to 44, 20.3% from 45 to 64, and 4.3% who were 65 years of age or older. The median age was 34 years. For every 100 females, there were 101.5 males. For every 100 females age 18 and over, there were 96.7 males.

The median income for a household in the town was $79,298, and the median income for a family was $81,433. Males had a median income of $55,455 versus $32,596 for females. The per capita income for the town was $31,483. About 0.7% of families and 2.0% of the population were below the poverty line, including 2.6% of those under age 18 and 5.2% of those age 65 or over.

In the media
The film Die Hard 2 used locations in Mead for filming including the Historic Highlandlake Church and the surrounding land which served as the base of operations for the villains who take over Dulles International Airport. During filming, the rear of the church was actually used as the front for exterior filming and a false front was built. Interiors of the church were shot on a soundstage.

Also Rachel Crow from The X Factor Season 1, is from Mead, Colorado.

See also

Outline of Colorado
Index of Colorado-related articles
State of Colorado
Colorado cities and towns
Colorado municipalities
Colorado counties
Weld County, Colorado
Colorado metropolitan areas
Front Range Urban Corridor
North Central Colorado Urban Area
Denver-Aurora-Boulder, CO Combined Statistical Area
Greeley, CO Metropolitan Statistical Area

References

External links
Town of Mead website
CDOT map of the Town of Mead

Towns in Weld County, Colorado
Towns in Colorado